Leea (Tagalog: Talyantan) is a genus of plants that are distributed throughout Northern and eastern Australia, New Guinea, South and Southeast Asia and parts of Africa. The APG IV system places Leea in the subfamily Leeoideae (Vitaceae). Leea is now placed in the family Vitaceae having previously been placed in its own family, Leeaceae, based on morphological differences between it and other Vitaceae genera. These differences include ovule number per locule (two in Vitaceae and one in Leeaceae), carpel number (two in Vitaceae and three in Leeaceae), and the absence or presence of a staminoidal tube (present in Leeaceae) and floral disc (present in Vitaceae). Pollen structure has also been examined for taxonomic demarcation, though studies have concluded that the pollen of Leeaceae and Vitaceae suggests the families should remain separate while other studies conclude that Leea should be included in Vitaceae.

The genus was named by Linnaeus after James Lee, the Scottish nurseryman based in Hammersmith, London who introduced many new plant discoveries to England at the end of the 18th century.

Ecology 
Leea flowers are visited by a variety of potential insect pollinators, including flies, wasps, bees, butterflies, and beetles. Some species may have evolved synchronized dichogamy as a mechanism to prevent self pollination.

Species
Plants of the World Online currently includes:

 Leea aculeata Blume ex Spreng.
 Leea acuminatissima Merr.
 Leea adwivedica K.Kumar
 Leea aequata L.
 Leea alata Edgew.
 Leea amabilis H.J.Veitch
 Leea angulata Korth. ex Miq.
 Leea asiatica (L.) Ridsdale
 Leea compactiflora Kurz
 Leea congesta Elmer
 Leea coryphantha Lauterb.
 Leea curtisii King
 Leea glabra C.L.Li
 Leea gonioptera Lauterb.
 Leea grandifolia Kurz
 Leea guineensis G.Don
 Leea heterodoxa K.Schum. & Lauterb.
 Leea indica (Burm.f.) Merr.
 Leea krukoffiana Ridsdale
 Leea longifoliola Merr.
 Leea macrophylla Roxb. ex Hornem.
 Leea macropus Lauterb. & K.Schum.
 Leea magnifolia Merr.
 Leea papuana Merr. & L.M.Perry
 Leea philippinensis Merr.
 Leea quadrifida Merr.
 Leea rubra Blume
 Leea saxatilis Ridl.
 Leea setuligera C.B.Clarke
 Leea simplicifolia Zoll. & Moritzi
 Leea smithii Koord.
 Leea spinea Desc.
 Leea suaveolens Merr. & L.M.Perry
 Leea tetramera B.L.Burtt
 Leea thorelii Gagnep.
 Leea tinctoria Lindl. ex Baker
 Leea tuberculosemen C.B.Clarke
 Leea unifoliolata Merr.
 Leea zippeliana Miq.

References

External links 

 
Vitaceae genera